Omar-Sharif Cook (born January 28, 1982) is an American-Montenegrin professional basketball coach and former player who is an assistant coach for the Cleveland Charge of the NBA G League. He represented Montenegro internationally. Prior to entering the draft he was considered a top 10 overall prospect by several NBA scouts.

Amateur career
Cook played high school basketball at Christ The King Regional High School, and then played college basketball at St. John's University. Cook ranked second in the nation and first in the Big East in assists during the one year he spent at St. John's. He also broke Mark Jackson's record for the most assists in a game for a St. John's player with 17, against Stony Brook University.

Professional career
Cook was drafted by the Orlando Magic of the NBA as the third pick in the second round (31st overall) of the 2001 NBA Draft. He was immediately traded to the Denver Nuggets, but failed to make the team, reportedly because of his inability to shoot the ball effectively. From 2001 to 2004, Cook made some pre-season appearances for teams in the league, also managing 22 regular season games played (17 with the Portland Trail Blazers in the 2003–04 season and five with the Toronto Raptors in the 2004–05 season). In July 2005, he was drafted by the AAPBL, but the league folded less than two weeks after the draft.

He also briefly led the NBA D-League in steals and assists in the 2004–05 season, while playing with the Fayetteville Patriots. Cook's final NBA game was played on April 20th, 2005 in a 104 - 95 victory over the Cleveland Cavaliers. In his final game, Cook recorded 19 points, 9 assists, 2 rebounds, 2 steals and 1 block.

During the 2005–06 season, Cook played in the Belgian league with Dexia Mons-Hainaut. The following year, he played with two teams, the French Pro A club SIG Strasbourg and the Russian Super League club Samara. In the 2007–08 season, he played with the Adriatic League club Crvena zvezda. He had the best season of his career with Crvena zvezda, where he was one of the team leaders.

On June 26, 2008, he joined the Spanish league's Unicaja, signing with the club for two seasons. In 2010, he signed a two-year deal with Spanish basketball club Power Electronics Valencia.

In 2011, he signed a two-year deal with Italian team Armani Jeans Milano. In December 2012, after Milano was eliminated from the Euroleague, Cook signed with Caja Laboral until the end of the season.

On August 6, 2013, Cook signed with Lietuvos rytas of Lithuania for the 2013–14 season.

On September 30, 2014, Cook signed a two-month deal with Budućnost Podgorica of Montenegro. On November 14, 2014, he extended his contract with Budućnost for the rest of the season. On August 15, 2015, he re-signed with Budućnost for one more season.

On August 20, 2016, Cook signed with Spanish club Estudiantes for the 2016–17 season. On July 17, 2019, Cook signed a one-plus-one deal with Herbalife Gran Canaria.

On July 24, 2020, he has signed with San Pablo Burgos of the Liga ACB.

On July 15, 2021, he has signed with Casademont Zaragoza of the Liga ACB.

Coaching Career
On September 29, 2022, Cook was hired as an assistant coach for the Cleveland Charge of the NBA G League.

Career statistics

NBA

Regular season

|-
| style="text-align:left;"| 2003–04
| style="text-align:left;"| Portland
| 17 || 0 || 8.2 || .259 || .000 || .000 || .4 || 1.4 || .6 || .0 || .8
|-
| style="text-align:left;"| 2004–05
| style="text-align:left;"| Toronto
| 5 || 0 || 14.8 || .417 || .000 || .500 || 1.4 || 4.4 || 1.2 || .2 || 4.6
|- class="sortbottom"
| style="text-align:center;" colspan="2"| Career
| 22 || 0 || 9.7 || .333 || .000 || .500 || .6 || 2.1 || .7 || .0 || 1.7

Montenegrin national team
In May 2008, Cook received Montenegrin citizenship, thus applying to represent Montenegro's national basketball team.

References

External links

 Omar Cook at aba-liga.com
 Omar Cook at acb.com
 Omar Cook at eurobasket.com
 Omar Cook at euroleague.net

1982 births
Living people
Montenegrin men's basketball players
American men's basketball players
American emigrants to Montenegro
ABA League players
American expatriate basketball people in Belgium
American expatriate basketball people in Canada
American expatriate basketball people in France
American expatriate basketball people in Germany
American expatriate basketball people in Lithuania
American expatriate basketball people in Montenegro
American expatriate basketball people in Russia
American expatriate basketball people in Serbia
American expatriate basketball people in Spain
Baloncesto Málaga players
Basketball players from New York City
BC Rytas players
BC Samara players
Belfius Mons-Hainaut players
CB Estudiantes players
CB Gran Canaria players
CB Miraflores players
Fayetteville Patriots players
KK Budućnost players
KK Crvena zvezda players
Liga ACB players
McDonald's High School All-Americans
Montenegrin expatriate basketball people in Serbia
Montenegrin expatriate basketball people in Spain
Montenegrin people of African-American descent
Naturalized citizens of Montenegro
Olimpia Milano players
Orlando Magic draft picks
Parade High School All-Americans (boys' basketball)
Point guards
Portland Trail Blazers players
Saski Baskonia players
SIG Basket players
Sportspeople from Brooklyn
St. John's Red Storm men's basketball players
Toronto Raptors players
Valencia Basket players